Alexander D. Hall (born August 13, 1990) is an American writer, showrunner, horror fiction novelist, and documentarian. He is known for creating and producing the web series Ben Drowned (2010-2020) and showrunning the subsequent alternate reality game. He was the host of the podcast The Digital Fireside and created several documentaries.

Biography 
Hall was born in Carmel, Indiana and began his career in the creative arts in 2008. He graduated from Brebeuf Jesuit Preparatory School in 2009, and attended Saint Louis University until 2011.

In 2010 Hall wrote Ben Drowned - a story about an artificial intelligence named BEN that haunts a Nintendo 64 video game cartridge. Ben Drowned would go on to receive widespread critical acclaim and have a readership in the millions. The story became an example of a modern urban legend and a major influence in helping to legitimize creepypasta as a literary genre and created many of the recognizable tropes that are now seen today in modern internet horror stories. 

Hall later revealed that he had written another creepy-pasta under a pen name in an interview. There were attempts to adapt Ben Drowned into a Clive Barker and Warner Brothers series.  

Hall created a series of Gonzo style documentaries and hosted a podcast interviewing Americans from eclectic walks of life. The most notable documentary piece from this time was covering Chris Cantelmo, a Yale-trained scientist purporting that N,N-Dimethyltryptamine cured his brain cancer. 

In 2020 Hall created a sequel to Ben Drowned utilizing OpenAI to generate art and music assets for the story. Hall expressed enthusiasm for this emerging technology, citing that they could expand the possibilities available to independent creators, but urged caution that these tools could quickly render many artists/creators obsolete.

Works 

 Normal (2008) Creator, Writer, Producer
 Ben Drowned (2010-2020) Creator, Writer, Producer
 The Digital Fireside (2019-2020)

References

External links 

 
 

1990 births
Living people
People from Indianapolis
People from Carmel, Indiana
21st-century American writers
American writers of young adult literature
Writers from Indiana
21st-century American novelists